San Francesco is a 15th-century, Roman Catholic church and convent located on the Via Ducale connecting the town of Barga with the lower valley, in the region of Tuscany, Italy.

History
The church houses a 15th-century terracotta works by the studio of Andrea della Robbia. The convent features a fifteenth-century cloister inspired by Franciscan simplicity. The altarpiece with the Nativity can be traced to around 1500.

References

Roman Catholic churches in Tuscany
Churches in the province of Lucca
15th-century Roman Catholic church buildings in Italy
Buildings and structures in Barga, Tuscany